The 39th Grey Cup was the Canadian Football League's championship game of the 1951 season, played on November 24, 1951.

The Ottawa Rough Riders defeated the Saskatchewan Roughriders 21–14 at Toronto's Varsity Stadium before a crowd of 27,341 fans in the first Grey Cup match-up between the two similarly named teams.

Game summary
Saskatchewan Roughriders (14) - TDs, Jack Nix, Sully Glasser; cons., Red Ettinger (2); singles, Glenn Dobbs (2).

Ottawa Rough Riders (21) - TDs, Benny MacDonell, Pete Karpuk, Alton Baldwin; cons., Bob Gain (3); singles, Bruce Cummings (2), Tom O'Malley.

External links
 
 

Grey Cup
Grey Cup
Grey Cups hosted in Vancouver
1951 in British Columbia
Saskatchewan Roughriders
Ottawa Rough Riders
1950s in Vancouver
November 1951 sports events in Canada